Kauri is a locality in Northland, New Zealand. State Highway 1 passes through the area. Kamo is to the south, and Hikurangi is to the north. Mt Parakiore is a volcanic dome rising 391 metres (1,283 ft) to the southwest. It is about one million years old, and part of the Harbour Fault, which also includes Mt Hikurangi near Hikurangi, and Parahaki in Whangarei.

The area, initially called Kaurihohore, was settled by immigrants from Nova Scotia in 1856.

Demographics

Kauri statistical area had a population of 1,746 at the 2018 New Zealand census, an increase of 258 people (17.3%) since the 2013 census, and an increase of 408 people (30.5%) since the 2006 census. There were 588 households, comprising 879 males and 867 females, giving a sex ratio of 1.01 males per female. The median age was 45.9 years (compared with 37.4 years nationally), with 363 people (20.8%) aged under 15 years, 219 (12.5%) aged 15 to 29, 846 (48.5%) aged 30 to 64, and 321 (18.4%) aged 65 or older.

Ethnicities were 91.8% European/Pākehā, 17.2% Māori, 2.1% Pacific peoples, 1.9% Asian, and 1.9% other ethnicities. People may identify with more than one ethnicity.

The percentage of people born overseas was 15.8, compared with 27.1% nationally.

Although some people chose not to answer the census's question about religious affiliation, 58.6% had no religion, 29.6% were Christian, 0.7% were Hindu and 2.2% had other religions.

Of those at least 15 years old, 252 (18.2%) people had a bachelor's or higher degree, and 243 (17.6%) people had no formal qualifications. The median income was $36,000, compared with $31,800 nationally. 300 people (21.7%) earned over $70,000 compared to 17.2% nationally. The employment status of those at least 15 was that 705 (51.0%) people were employed full-time, 222 (16.1%) were part-time, and 48 (3.5%) were unemployed.

Education
The School's current principal Leslee Allen has been head of the school since 2001.
The school celebrated its 125th jubilee in 2002.

Notes

Whangarei District
Populated places in the Northland Region